Markus Hipfl (born 26 April 1978) is a former professional tennis player from Austria.

Career
Hipfl had a noteworthy junior career. He won the Under-16s Orange Bowl in 1994 and was also a finalist in that year's European Championship. In 1996 he finished runner-up in the 1996 US Open Boys' Singles, losing in the final to German Daniel Elsner.

During the 1999 ATP Tour, Hipfl broke into the top 100 for the first time. He made the semi-finals of Morocco's Grand Prix Hassan II and was a quarter-finalist at four tournaments, in San Marino, Sankt Pölten, Sicily and Majorca.

His best performances in 2000 included being a semi-finalist at the Swedish Open and making another quarter-final appearance in the International Raiffeisen Grand Prix at Sankt Pölten.

Hipfl bettered his previous two efforts at the Sankt Pölten tournament in 2001, making it into the final, which he lost to fellow wild card Andrea Gaudenzi. He also reached quarter-finals at the 2001 Copa AT&T and the 2001 Estoril Open.

In 2002, he reached another International Raiffeisen Grand Prix quarter-final and was also a quarter-finalist at the 2002 BellSouth Open, after which he attained his career high ranking of 63.

At Grand Slams during his career he won a total of three matches, all in separate tournaments. His wins came against Andrew Ilie at the 1999 US Open, Nicolas Mahut in the 2000 French Open and Nikolay Davydenko at the 2002 Australian Open. He competed in four successive Wimbledon Championships from 1999 to 2002 but on each occasion lost in the opening round by five sets. The closest he got to registering a win was in 2002 when he lost 9–11 in the final set, to French qualifier Nicolas Thomann, despite serving 38 aces.

He took part in five ATP World Tour Masters 1000 tournaments during his career, only once failing to get past the first round. In both the 2001 and 2002 Monte-Carlo Masters he defeated Yevgeny Kafelnikov, the second time coming when the Russian was the third-ranked player in the ATP rankings.

Hipfl also played in seven Davis Cup ties for the Austrian team and had a 10–3 record, all in singles. In 1999, he helped Austria qualify for the following year's World Group with a straight sets win over Sweden's Magnus Gustafsson, in the fifth and decisive rubber. He had earlier upset world number 23 Magnus Norman.

Junior Grand Slam finals

Singles: 1 (1 runner-up)

ATP career finals

Singles: 1 (1 runner-up)

ATP Challenger and ITF Futures finals

Singles: 8 (2–6)

Doubles: 1 (0–1)

Performance timeline

Singles

External links

References

1978 births
Living people
Austrian male tennis players
Austrian expatriate sportspeople in Monaco
People from Wels
People from Monte Carlo
Sportspeople from Upper Austria